The Maugherow Peninsula is the largest and westernmost peninsula of County Sligo, Ireland. It is also less commonly referred to as the Raghly Peninsula, after Raghly Point, which is itself a headland of the peninsula. The peninsula acts as the northern boundary of Sligo Bay.

The peninsula's rugged coastline and exposed location has made it far less popular as a tourist destination than some of Sligo's other peninsulas, such as Mullaghmore, Rosses Point and Coolera. The area is largely flat and agricultural in nature, characterised by ribbon development. Carney is the sole nucleated village on the peninsula proper, while the larger town of Grange is located on the margins of the peninsula.

Places of interest
Ballygilgan Nature Reserve
Lissadell House
Knocklane Fort
Raghly Harbour
Streedagh Armada wrecksite
Streedagh Beach
Yellow Strand Beach

Gallery

See also
 Carbury, County Sligo
 Coastal landforms of Ireland

References

Geography of County Sligo
Landforms of County Sligo
Beaches of County Sligo
Ireland